They Were Five (French: Ils étaient cinq) is a 1952 French drama film directed by Jack Pinoteau and starring Marcel André, Jean Carmet and Jean Gaven. It was shot at the Boulogne Studios in Paris. The film's sets were designed by the art director Jacques Colombier.

Synopsis
Following the Second World War, five inseparable comrades return home and swear eternal friendship. However this proves to be harder than they expect in peacetime. It ends tragically for several of the characters, one of whom is killed in the War in Indochina.

Cast 
 Marcel André as  the commissioner
 Jean Carmet as  Jean, the postal worker
 Jean Gaven as  Marcel, the boxer
 Michel Jourdan as  Roger Courtois, the actor
 François Martin as  André Lamberay, the student
 Jean-Claude Pascal as Philippe, heir of a rich family
 Jean Marchat as  Frédo, the director of the cabaret "La joie de vivre"
 Arlette Merry as  Valérie, Roger's sister
 André Versini as Serge, Valérie's agent
 Nicole Besnard as  Simone, Jean's friend
 Robert Dalban as  Dufau, the manager
 Irène Hilda as  Fabienne Dorée
 Louis de Funès as  Albert, the manager

References

Bibliography
Marie, Michel. The French New Wave: An Artistic School. John Wiley & Sons, 2008.

External links 
 
 Ils étaient cinq (1952) at the Films de France

1952 films
French drama films
1950s French-language films
French black-and-white films
1952 drama films
Films shot at Boulogne Studios
Films directed by Jacques Pinoteau
1950s French films